This is a list of characters from the comic strip Peanuts by Charles M. Schulz. This list contains limited information on the characters; for more, visit their respective articles.

Main characters

Snoopy's siblings

Spike. Snoopy's older brother.
Belle. Snoopy's sister.

Unseen characters
 Adults implied in the strip include: the characters' parents; Linus van Pelt's teacher Miss Othmar and her replacement, Miss Halverson; Charlie Brown's baseball hero Joe Shlabotnik; Helen Sweetstory, author of the Bunny Wunny books; and Linus' blanket-hating grandmother. 
 In the 1966 animated TV special Charlie Brown's All-Stars and its accompanying book, Mr. Hennessy, proprietor of Hennessy's Hardware store, talks to Charlie Brown on the phone unseen to confirm his sponsorship of Charlie Brown's baseball team in a real league with real baseball uniforms, but changes his mind when Charlie Brown tells him that girls and a dog are on his team.
 Adults in most of the Peanuts animated cartoons are only heard by the unintelligible sounds of a muted trombone ("wah-wah-wah").
 The Little Red-Haired Girl, Charlie Brown's crush. Although she is seen in many animated television specials, she was never seen in the strip itself. In It's Your First Kiss, Charlie Brown, her name is given as Heather.
 The Great Pumpkin, an imaginary figure whom Linus believes to appear on Halloween Night in the most sincere pumpkin patch in order to deliver presents to good children.
 The Red Baron, Snoopy's nemesis while in the guise of a World War I Flying Ace. The battles occur while Snoopy is perched on his doghouse that becomes his Sopwith Camel. The battles between Snoopy and the Red Baron began in an October 10, 1965 Peanuts strip.
 Charlie Brown's unnamed pen pal and/or "pencil pal", with whom he occasionally corresponds.
 World War II, the vicious Cat Next Door who is Snoopy's enemy. A running gag is that Snoopy torments him and the cat often retaliates by swiping at Snoopy's doghouse, leaving barely any of the doghouse left.

References

Characters
Lists of comic strip characters